{{Infobox comics in other media
|code_name = Robin
|image = Logo de robin.gif
|imagesize = 
|caption =
|creators = Bob KaneJerry RobinsonBill Finger
|source = DC Comics
|debut = Detective Comics No. 38
|debutmo = April
|debutyr = 1940
|novels =
|books =
|films = {{Plainlist|
 Batman (1943)
 Batman and Robin (1949)
 Batman (1966)
 Batman Forever (1995)
 Batman & Robin (1997)
 Batman & Mr. Freeze: SubZero (1998)
 Justice League: The New Frontier (2008)
 Batman: Under the Red Hood (2010)
 Batman: The Dark Knight Returns (2012)
 Son of Batman (2014)
 Batman vs. Robin (2015)
 Batman: Bad Blood (2016)
 Justice League vs. Teen Titans (2016)
 Batman: Return of the Caped Crusaders (2016)
 The Lego Batman Movie (2017)
 Teen Titans: The Judas Contract (2017)
 Batman vs. Two-Face (2017)
 Batman Ninja (2018)
 Teen Titans Go! To the Movies (2018)
}}
|tv = 
|plays =
|music =
|radio = The Adventures of Superman (1945)
|scores =
|games =
|RPG =
|video =
|subcat = Batman
|sortkey = Robin
}}
In addition to DC Comics books, the superhero Robin also appears in other media, such as films, television and radio. Dick Grayson, Jason Todd, Tim Drake, Stephanie Brown and Damian Wayne are examples of the characters who use the name Robin.

Other than showing up in media associated with being Batman's sidekick, he also makes an appearance as the leader of the Teen Titans. 

Television
Live-actionBatman (1966)In the 1960s Batman television series and its 1966 movie offshoot, Robin (Dick Grayson) was played by Burt Ward. Ward reprises his role as Robin in Legends of the Superheroes, and the Dick Grayson of Earth-66 in "Crisis on Infinite Earths".

 Titans (2018 - Present)Three incarnations of Robin appear in the 2018 DC Universe series Titans. Brenton Thwaites portrays Dick Grayson, the former sidekick of Batman who took Dick in after being orphaned following his parents death, and is the leader of a group of vigilantes known as the Titans. Curran Walters portrays Jason Todd, Dick's successor of Robin who was caught stealing Batmobile tires. Jay Lycurgo portrays Tim Drake, who made his live-action debut in the third season and is depicted as being of African American and Asian descent. Carrie Kelley, Daxton Chill, Stephanie Brown and Duke Thomas made uncredited (photo) cameo appearances in the episode "Barbara Gordon" in a file on the Batcomputer for replacement Robins which is discovered by Dick Grayson after the death of Jason.

Animation
The Adventures of Batman
The Adventures of Batman is an animated television series produced by Lou Scheimer's Filmation studios.

Super Friends

In DC Comics related cartoon series, produced by Filmation and Hanna-Barbera throughout the 1970s and 1980s, such as the Super Friends, Robin (Dick Grayson) was voiced by Casey Kasem or Burt Ward. Both the live-action and animated versions wore the standard Robin costume, much like the film serial versions of the 1940s. He is not paired with Batman in the Cartoon Network programs Justice League and Justice League Unlimited due to the Bat-Embargo which limited the use of Batman-related characters from any media source outside of the new Batman Begins movie franchise and The Batman animated series.

DC Animated Universe

The Dick Grayson incarnation of Robin made his first appearance during the first season of Batman: The Animated Series (1992–1995), voiced by Loren Lester. The second season was known as The Adventures of Batman and Robin. By the time the revamp series The New Batman Adventures (1997-99) takes place, Grayson has adopted the identity of Nightwing. Grayson appeared in the film Batman & Mr. Freeze: SubZero (1998) and makes uncredited cameo appearances in Justice League (2001-04) and Justice League Unlimited (2004-06). He is also referenced in Batman Beyond (1999-2001) and its feature film Batman Beyond: Return of the Joker (2000).

Tim Drake appears as the second incarnation in The New Batman Adventures (1997–99), though he is also partially based on Jason Todd. Versions of the Carrie Kelley (Anndi McAfee) and 1950s (Brianne Siddall) Robins, both in the original costume, also make short appearances on the show in a dream sequence from the episode "Legends of the Dark Knight".

Tim Drake was voiced by Mathew Valencia in The New Batman Adventures and in a guest appearance in Superman: The Animated Series and by Eli Marienthal and Shane Sweet in guest appearances in Static Shock, with the former also reprising his role in Batman: Mystery of the Batwoman. Dean Stockwell voiced an older Drake in Batman Beyond: Return of the Joker while Valencia reprised the younger version. Drake also makes uncredited cameo appearances in Justice League (2002-04).

Teen Titans

The Cartoon Network series Teen Titans features Robin as the eponymous team's leader. His true identity is never revealed in the series, although he is heavily implied to be Dick Grayson. Robin joins Beast Boy, Cyborg, Raven and Starfire when Jump City is threatened by aliens in "Go!". Robin is generally respected by the others as the team's best leader, but on the inside he is driven by an unhealthy obsession to win, which sometimes alienates him from his teammates ("Divide And Conquer", "Masks", "Winner Take All", "The Quest").

In many instances, Robin's relationship to Batman is heavily referenced. In "Go", just before Robin attacks a thief, bats fly at him. After a while the thief says, "This isn't your town, aren't you supposed to be with..." only to be interrupted by Robin who says, "Just moved here. And from now on I work alone.", and throughout the episode, he says he doesn't want to be in a team again so soon. In "Haunted", Raven uses her powers to enter Robin's mind; one of the images she sees is Robin's shadow in a cave area swearing an oath to someone, and part of a circus ring with two figures falling. When Robin rejects Slade in "Apprentice: Part 2" as a father figure he mentions "I already have a father", and then the screen shows a shot of a dark sky with bats flying through it, also referring to Batman. In that same episode, a battle ensues on top of a building that says "Wayne Enterprises". In "The Quest", Robin says that he was trained by the best and this is believed to be a reference to the Batman.

Robin also has shown to have romantic feelings for Starfire since they first met. There have been romantic moments shared between the two in the series, but neither Robin nor Starfire admit their feelings for each other until the movie Teen Titans: Trouble in Tokyo. During the film, Robin and Starfire come very close to admitting their feelings and having their first romantic kiss, but sadly Robin proves to be too focused on the mission (and also being interrupted by Beast Boy and the others) before insisting that, as heroes, they can never be anything more. However, after the film's climax battle, Robin and Starfire finally admit their feelings for each other and share their first true romantic kiss with Cyborg commenting, "Well, it's about time!". In the end, they are both seen holding hands and finally become a romantic couple.

The Batman

Dick Grayson appeared as Robin in The Batman, voiced by Evan Sabara. In this version, Dick Grayson is an energetic, gifted 12-year-old acrobat and one of the main attractions of Hayley's Circus, along with his parents, as part of the amazing Flying Grayson's act. His life was changed forever when Tony Zucco and his brothers tried to threaten Grayson's father into taking a "protection" policy. When the Graysons refused, an altercation resulted in the police and Batman being called. The Zuccos were easily defeated for the moment one of Tony's brothers was even captured.

An angered Zucco altered the rigs on the Flying Graysons trapeze act, causing Dick's parents to fall to their deaths right in front of their son during a performance. With no surviving family members, Dick was taken in by Bruce Wayne as Bruce saw shades of himself in Dick after his own parents' murder. After Dick discovered that Wayne was Batman, the two worked together to capture Zucco. Dick chose the codename "Robin" because that is what his mother had called him.

As depicted in a possible future during the episode "Artifacts", Dick Grayson gives up the "Robin" name and costume to become Nightwing. Barbara and Batman still persist in calling him by his original codename. Batman did this more out of habit, and Barbara did it as a flirting sort of way to annoy Dick. The police department who discover the Batcave in the beginning of the episode call Robin as 'Red Robin', a reference to Kingdom Come, and they theorize that Bruce Wayne was Red Robin (with his father as Batman and his mother as Batwoman).

Krypto the Superdog

In the Krypto the Superdog episode, "Bathound and the Robin", a literal robin called Robbie is saved by Ace the Bathound and wants to be Ace's sidekick, much to the dismay of Ace. Robbie's costume resembled the classic outfit of Dick Grayson.

Batman: The Brave and the Bold

Dick Grayson was featured in Batman: The Brave and the Bold in the episode "The Color of Revenge!" He is depicted as the protector of Blüdhaven – the city where he fights crime in the comics as Nightwing – but he is seen in the episode still as Robin. The rift between him and Batman has already taken place, and he is seen to still be angry at Batman for still treating him as a sidekick rather than a superhero in his own right. It is only after cooperating with Batman to defeat Crazy Quilt that Robin earns Batman's respect. After Crazy Quilt is defeated, Robin joins Batman when Killer Moth hijacks the Gotham Bank Money Train, but he rides in the sidecar of Batman's motorcycle (something he stated he never wanted to do again). Robin was voiced by Crawford Wilson, and the teaser episode has several references to the 1960s Batman television series. Subsequently, he is seen in "Sidekicks Assemble!" where he leads fellow sidekicks Speedy and Aqualad in a battle against Ra's al Ghul. At the end of the episode, he decides to step out of the shadow of his mentor and take the costume and identity of Nightwing. He is seen as Robin once again in the teaser for "Emperor Joker!", which shows a flashback to an earlier battle between the Dynamic Duo and Firefly. In "The Criss Cross Conspiracy!", Nightwing returns and a flashback shows him as Robin. Dick eventually becomes the new Batman in the alternate future story, "The Knights of Tomorrow!", with Damian Wayne acting as the new Robin. The episode ends with Damian succeeding Dick as the new Batman after the former retires, and Damian's unnamed son (voiced by Sebastian Bader) becomes the new Robin. Damian Wayne is voiced by both Patrick Cavanaugh (as a child) and by Diedrich Bader (as an adult). Later, in the opening for "Triumvirate of Terror" Robin was seen in the team of the Justice League International playing baseball against the Legion of Doom.

Young Justice
Robin (Dick Grayson) is one of the main cast members in the animated adaptation of Young Justice. The character is voiced by actor Jesse McCartney. Along with Aqualad, Kid Flash and Superboy, Robin is one of the founding members of Young Justice. However, when not on team missions, he still lives and performs his duties in Gotham City. As the most experienced member of the team, he assumed that he would automatically be the leader, but this would prove to not be the case. When in combat with Batman, their relationship is so defined that they do not need to communicate and Robin therefore assumed he could disappear and that others would immediately know what to do. Robin nominates Aqualad who accepts, saying that Robin will one day take over as he was born to lead the team. Throughout missions, Robin is shown to be the hacker of the group, making use of the computer interface on his wrist. As the youngest member of the team, he is still a bit immature and can often be heard laughing in combat as to either toy with or intimidate his opponents. He also questions the meaning of words, such as wondering why something is overwhelming, and not just "whelming".

In Season 2, set five years later, Dick Grayson has become Nightwing. He still leads the Team and has been replaced as Robin by Tim Drake. During the episode "Satisfaction," a memorial hologram of Jason Todd, the second Robin, can be seen.

The third season, Young Justice: Outsiders, is set two years after the previous outing. Nightwing still plays a prominent role in the story. In addition, Tim Drake and Stephanie Brown play minor roles. There are also cameo appearances from Damian Wayne and a revived Jason Todd.

New Teen Titans
The Teen Titans iteration of Robin returns in the New Teen Titans shorts, with Scott Menville reprising his role. One of the shorts included an appearance by the DC One Million version of Robin.

Teen Titans Go!
The Teen Titans iteration of Robin returns in Teen Titans Go! with Scott Menville reprising his role. In the show, Robin is portrayed as the self-appointed, hard-as-nails, hubristic, slightly power mad leader of the Teen Titans but fairly more light-hearted, and has a huge crush on Starfire but is too nervous to admit this, though he is also seen as being very arrogant, often depicting himself as the so-called "best superhero", believing that he is better than his friends and heroes should always put themselves in the spotlight and take all the glory. He is also a "sleep-Fighter", and is insecure about his lack of superpowers, which has, on multiple occasions, led to one of the other Titans committing mutiny and replacing Robin as leader. In some episodes, he is shown to fall into fits of madness easily, completely ignoring his team to follow through on his own view of how to carry something out. Such examples included continuing to dig an escape tunnel despite being rescued, forcing his teammates to rely on seven numbered options and scant resources during an educational 1800s-style road trip without even the slightest bit of concern for their well-being (which ultimately leads to their deaths, which he reacts to with a lot of callousness), and thinking that nature is so dangerous he needs to be on edge and eat whatever he can find. An episode also showed that he had a backup Robin squad which features Carrie Kelley, a darker Tim Drake, and the upbeat 60s version all voiced by Scott.

DC Super Hero Girls
Dick Grayson appears in DC Super Hero Girls with Keith Ferguson voicing the character. His outfit was inspired by his portrayal, Burt Ward, from the 1966 TV series. He made his first appearance in "#FromBatToWorst" where the young Barbara Gordon wanted to team up with Batman. Robin shows up encountering Babs about having a sidekick as usual. In the episode "#GothamCon", Babs and Harleen went to Gotham City for a convention when Robin appears instead of Batman hosting the event. In the episode "#TweenTitans", he is one of the cast members of the reality television show created by Bruce Wayne, "Make It Wayne" and used to be having a birthday party along with fellow Titans in their tween versions, in which Jessica Cruz and Karen Beecher babysits them and caused chaos.

Harley Quinn
Damian Wayne appears as Robin in HBO Max's adult animated series Harley Quinn, voiced by Jacob Tremblay. He is portrayed as a spoiled brat who is not taken seriously by most individuals. In "Finding Mr. Right", in an effort to improve his reputation, he appears on a talk show and lies about Harley Quinn agreeing to be his arch-enemy. Offended, Harley kidnaps him and threatens to feed him to King Shark unless he confesses. Once he does, she reveals the talk show audience behind a curtain, humiliating him. However, Damian suffers a nosebleed, and King Shark goes berserk after smelling it. While he is saved by his father Batman, Joker temporarily kidnaps him before Batman saves him again. The Dark Knight later comforts Robin and assures him he can wait until he is ready for his own nemesis. In the season two premiere "New Gotham", Damian took up the mantle of Batman after he disappeared in the chaos caused by Joker's destruction of Gotham during the season one finale despite not being old enough to do so.

In season three, Dick Grayson makes his debut as Nightwing, voiced by Harvey Guillén. In “There’s No Ivy in Team”, Dick returns to Gotham after being away for years, reunites with Batman, and meets Batgirl and Damian, who currently holds the title of Robin. Nightwing eventually joins the Bat Family in trying to stop Firefly from attacking the Gotham Corn Factory, but sabotages the team's plan due to his preference for solo work. Following a mental breakdown and an encounter with Harley and her crew during a team building exercise in an escape room, Nightwing slowly grows accustomed to teamwork. He soon becomes a respected member of the Bat Family, helping them fight and capture Harley as well as cheer up Bruce as the season goes on. In “Climax at Jazzapajizza”, Nightwing refuses to listen to Harley’s claim of Bruce’s reckless attempt to resurrect his deceased parents. He is shocked to see Bruce enter with his parents, resurrected as plant zombies. As a zombie apocalypse begins, Nightwing reluctantly agrees to work with Harley in order to stop it. Nightwing and Batgirl consider killing Poison Ivy in order to end the apocalypse, but Harley insists on talking it out. Nightwing appears at the end of “The Horse and the Sparrow”, welcoming Harley Quinn to the Bat Family.

 Web series 
Damian Wayne appears as Robin in DC Super Hero Girls, voiced by Grey DeLisle. In the season 5 episode, "Bat-Napped", Robin was taken hostage and Batgirl needs to save him before getting worst against bad guys.

Film

Live-action serials

Batman
In director Lambert Hillyer's 1943 film serial Batman, Robin was played by Douglas Croft. Croft was the only actor to portray Robin at the actual age of sixteen; subsequent live-action actors have either been in their early to mid to late 20s.

Batman and Robin
Robin was played by 25-year-old Johnny Duncan in Columbia Pictures's Batman and Robin (1949), directed by Spencer Gordon Bennet.

Live-action feature films

Burton-Schumacher series

Early concepts

Robin did not appear in the Tim Burton movies Batman (1989) and Batman Returns (1992). This was an unusual move as the two 1940s serials as well as the 1966 movie and attendant TV show had presented the 'Dynamic Duo' as an inseparable pair, with the general public unaware that the comic-book incarnation of Batman often worked alone. The special edition version of the Batman (1989) DVD features an animated storyboard sequence of when Robin's parents are killed by the Joker. Jason Hillhouse provides the voice of Dick Grayson, while Kevin Conroy and Mark Hamill reprise their respective roles (from the DC animated universe) as Batman and the Joker in the storyboard sequence. Although Kiefer Sutherland was considered, Burton planned to cast Northern Irish actor Ricky Addison Reed as Robin, but later felt it was unimportant to the story and cut Robin out altogether. In an earlier script of Batman Returns, he was portrayed as a technologically savvy street kid who would help Batman following his narrow escape when The Penguin tried to kill him. He would later play a crucial role in Batman's final confrontation with The Penguin. In that script, he was simply called Robin, has no known real name, and was to be played by Marlon Wayans.

Comic series
In 2021, DC released a comic series continuation of the Tim Burton films entitled Batman '89, which includes a new version of Robin based on Marlon Wayans, penned by Sam Hamm named Drake Winston. 

Batman Forever

Wayans was considered for the role of Robin in Batman Forever, but the change in directors from Burton to Joel Schumacher would also mean a change in the choice of actor for the role of Robin. Chris O'Donnell played the character of Dick Grayson in the film, alongside Val Kilmer in the role of Batman. Dick Grayson's parents and older brother were murdered by Two-Face during a hostage situation at the annual Gotham Circus after the family helps get rid of a bomb rigged to explode. Bruce Wayne takes him in as his ward out of guilt for being unable to save Dick's family. Dick soon finds out that Bruce is Batman and becomes a costumed hero in his late teens.

Batman and Robin

O'Donnell reprised the role in the 1997 film Batman & Robin, this time opposite George Clooney as Batman. Tension between Batman and Robin is present in the film due to Robin growing tired of playing second fiddle to Batman and desiring to break free from Batman's shadow, particularly after Robin's recklessness leads to him getting frozen by Mr. Freeze. These feelings are later amplified when Poison Ivy exposes Robin to her pheromone dust and causes him to fall in love with her, sowing seeds of doubt regarding Batman's faith in his ward. In the film's climax, Robin eventually sees through Ivy's schemes and makes amends with Batman, and throughout the film, it is hinted that he harbours romantic feelings towards Alfred's niece, Barbara Wilson, who later becomes Batgirl. His costume is a blue rubber suit with a red bird symbol on the chest. He also wears a silvery Arctic version of his Robin costume.

Cancelled Robin spin-off
Chris O'Donnell revealed to Access Hollywood that a Robin spin-off was planned but got scrapped after Batman & Robin.

Christopher Nolan's The Dark Knight Trilogy
In a June 2005 interview, Christopher Nolan, the director of Batman Begins and The Dark Knight, said that as long as he was directing the franchise, Robin would not be appearing. Since Christian Bale was portraying Batman as a young man at the time of "Year One", Dick Grayson is still a child at this point. Bale has also given the same opinion regarding Robin, even though his favorite Batman story, Batman: Dark Victory, focuses on Robin's origin.

In the film The Dark Knight Rises, Batman finds an ally in a young policeman who goes by the name of John Blake (portrayed by Joseph Gordon-Levitt), an original identity created exclusively for the film. 

Blake is an orphan whose mother was killed in a car crash and whose father was murdered in a gambling-related dispute when Blake was still a child. He was raised in St. Swithin's, an orphanage sponsored by the Wayne Foundation. During his time there, he learned to hide his anger over his father's death and being orphaned. When Bruce Wayne visited the orphanage, Blake noticed similar qualities between himself and Bruce, and single-handedly deduced that Bruce was Batman. When he was old enough, he became a GCPD police officer. 

After the discovery of  Bane, Blake confronts Bruce and attempts to convince him to return as Batman. When Bane publicly declares himself, Blake takes  Commissioner Gordon into hiding and arrests Selina Kyle to question her about Bruce's disappearance. He also shows his repulsion towards Gordon and Batman covering up the crimes of Harvey Dent. Blake joins Gordon and the other police officers in a revolt against Bane's rule, but is caught and nearly executed. He is rescued by Batman, who tells him to evacuate the city. This attempt fails when external officers blow up the only bridge leading away from Gotham out of fear, Bane having threatened earlier to have the bomb detonated (by a random citizen, later revealed to be Talia al Ghul, masquerading as Miranda Tate) if anyone tried to leave Gotham. 

After Batman apparently sacrifices himself to save the city, Blake quits the GCPD, disgusted that the mainland police were willing to let Gotham perish. He attends Bruce's funeral with Gordon, Alfred Pennyworth and Lucius Fox. He later attends the reading of Bruce's will, and is pleasantly surprised to discover that Wayne Manor will become a home for the city's at-risk orphans, named in honor of  Thomas and Martha Wayne. When he gives the name "Blake, John" to a clerk holding a package that Bruce had left him, he is told there is nothing there for him. He hands over an ID and suggests they try his legal first name, which is revealed to be Robin. The clerk gives him  GPS coordinates and spelunking gear, before she tells him that he should use the name "Robin" more often. At the end of the film, Blake follows the coordinates, and finds the Batcave. Among the characters to use the Robin identity, comparisons have been drawn between Robin John Blake and Richard John "Dick" Grayson in particular.

Gordon-Levitt has stated that the ending of The Dark Knight Rises is not a set up for a spin-off film, but is the true conclusion of Christopher Nolan's Batman series.

DC Extended Universe

Batman v Superman: Dawn of Justice

In Batman v Superman: Dawn of Justice a vandalized Robin costume is seen in a memorial case. A behind-the-scenes video released for the DC Extended Universe stated it belonged to Jason Todd, and was labeled as such at the Warner Bros. Studio Tour Hollywood.  However, in July 2018, director Zack Snyder elaborated that the vandalized Robin costume in Batman v Superman was originally intended to belong to Dick Grayson, with the backstory being that the character was killed by the Joker before the events of the film, but this was changed due to the studio beginning the development of a Nightwing movie. The director also stated that had he stayed with the franchise, Robin would "stay dead...till Carrie", hinting at plans in future sequels for Carrie Kelley to take up the Robin mantle.

Suicide Squad

In Suicide Squad, it is revealed Harley Quinn was an accomplice to Robin's murder. Director/writer David Ayer later clarified that he intended for Joker to be the sole person who killed Robin and that Harley was added as an accomplice through late rewrites by then President and CCO of DC Entertainment, and Executive Producer, Geoff Johns when the film was undergoing extensive reshoots. 

 DC Universe 

The Damian Wayne version of Robin will appear in the live action film The Brave and the Bold, set in the DC Universe (DCU) media franchise.

Animation

Justice League: The New Frontier

Robin (Dick Grayson) was featured in the DC DTV movie Justice League: New Frontier, where he was adopted, as a teenager (not a child, as in most interpretations), during the events of the movie. Batman did so because he realized that he was frightening those he was trying to protect. The circumstances of his adoption are not explained. He was voiced by Shane Haboucha.

Batman: Under the Red Hood

In the DC Universe Animated Original Movie Batman: Under the Red Hood, an adaptation of the bestselling Batman storyline "Under the Hood" from Batman #635–650 and Batman Annual No. 25, Neil Patrick Harris voices Dick Grayson/Nightwing while Jensen Ackles portrays Jason Todd/Red Hood. Vincent Martella and his younger brother Alexander Martella each provide the voice of the young Jason Todd in different ages as Robin in a flashback in the beginning of the film.

Batman: The Dark Knight Returns
Carrie Kelly appears as Robin in the two-part animated film Batman: The Dark Knight Returns, voiced by Ariel Winter. Being a fan of Batman, Carrie took the mantle of Robin herself when the Mutant crime organization had been wreaking havoc on Gotham. Batman comes to see her as a suitable Robin, training her and using her to gather intel. She helps him with leading the former Mutant's group Sons of Batman into learning his less violent ways, when Gotham needed martial law enforced. When Batman is called out to a duel with Superman after refusing to go back into retirement, Carrie helps Bruce fake his death. She, along with Oliver Queen (Green Arrow) and Bruce train the Sons of Batman group to begin taking on his job.

JLA Adventures: Trapped in Time

Jack DeSena voices an unidentified Robin in the Target exclusive 2014 direct-to-video animated feature JLA Adventures: Trapped in Time.DC Animated Movie Universe
In 2013, Justice League: War was released, the first of a series of films that shared the same continuity, known as the DC Animated Movie Universe. Damian Wayne and Dick Grayson appear in several of these films, Damian/Robin being voiced by Stuart Allan while Sean Maher voices Dick/Nightwing.

Son of BatmanSon of Batman, an adaptation of Grant Morrison' Batman storyline "Batman and Son", was the first time Damian Wayne had appeared in a DC-related film.

Batman vs. Robin
In Batman vs. Robin, Damian comes into contact with the Court of Owls, being tempted to leave Batman and join him. Throughout the film, Batman and Robin fight over Damian's rawness and his lack of discipline, leading to Damian almost joining the court before Talon (voiced by Jeremy Sisto), an assassin for the Court, is ordered to kill him when the leader discovers his secret identity. After Talon massacres the entire court, he and Robin clash in the Batcave before Talon commits suicide. Afterwards, Damian leaves for a monastery in the Himalayas.

Batman: Bad Blood
Damian returns in Batman: Bad Blood, teaming up with Dick Grayson, who briefly assumes the Batman mantle to investigate his father's disappearance. The Heretic (voiced by Travis Willingham), makes his first film appearance, as an artificially-aged clone of Damian like in the comics. Heretic attempts to absorb Damian's mind into his so he will know what it feels like to be loved, but Talia al Ghul executes him for his treachery and punishment, much to Damian's horror.

Justice League vs. Teen Titans
In Justice League vs. Teen Titans, Batman decides to have Robin join the Teen Titans to teach him about teamwork and has Nightwing drop him off at Titans Tower. Damian ends up warming up to the team after being initially hostile towards them, forming a particular friendship with Raven.

Teen Titans: The Judas Contract
In Teen Titans: The Judas Contract, Robin is still a member of the Teen Titans. Suspicious of new team member Terra, he begins tracking her movements. Through this action, he learns that Deathstroke survived their last encounter in Son of Batman and that he still seeks revenge against him. Robin tries to fight him off, but is subdued and captured by Terra, who is working with Deathstroke. Later, he and most of the other Teen Titans are hooked up into a machine so that Brother Blood, leader of a cult called H.I.V.E., can absorb all their powers. Nightwing eventually intervenes and saves them; he and Robin subsequently battle Deathstroke while the rest of the Titans battle Brother Blood. Terra intervenes in the fight and kills Deathstroke after he had betrayed her. Following Brother Blood's defeat and Terra's death, Damian is given a dog by Raven, whom he names Titus.

The Death of Superman
Damian makes a cameo at the end of The Death of Superman, comforting his father after Superman dies defeating Doomsday.

Batman: Hush
Damian cameos appearance in Batman: Hush. After learning that his father is dating reformed thief Catwoman, he voices concern to Bruce and warns him to cover his drink.

Justice League Dark: Apokolips War
In Justice League Dark: Apokolips War, Robin is one of the few Teen Titans to survive Darkseid's conquest of Earth following the defeat of the Justice League. Blaming Superman's faulty strategy for the deaths of his friends, Damian reforms the League of Assassins, with Lady Shiva as his second-in-command. Two years later, Raven, Constantine, Etrigan, and a depowered Superman seek out Damian for his help in defeating Darkseid. Damian reluctantly joins them, revealing that he attempted to revive Nightwing with the Lazarus Pits, but the process left Dick insane, forcing Damian to keep him locked up. Damian privately admits to Raven that he had developed feelings for her.

When the heroes travel to Apokolips, Damian, as Robin, is forced to fight Batman, now brainwashed and serving as Darkseid's second-in-command. When Batman emerges victorious, Darkseid commands him to kill his son. However, the sight of his defeated son reminds Batman of the night his parents died, allowing him to break free of Darkseid's control. Darkseid attempts to kill Batman with his Omega Beams for his defiance, but Robin dies when he takes the blast for his father. With the aid of Zatanna's spirit, Raven revives Damian and heals his injuries. 

In the aftermath of the battle, the surviving heroes return to Earth, where Damian gives Dick to a partially cyberized Starfire. Constantine encourages Flash to run back in time and create another Flashpoint. Just before the timeline is reset, Damian and Raven share their first and only kiss.

Batman: Return of the Caped Crusaders
Ward reprised his role as Dick Grayson/Robin in the animated movie Batman: Return of the Caped Crusaders and its sequel Batman vs. Two-Face.

The Lego Batman Movie
Michael Cera voices Dick Grayson in The Lego Movie spin-off The Lego Batman Movie. This version was adopted by Batman as a teenager and his Robin outfit is actually a modified Reggae outfit for Batman with the pants taken off. He has large, green glasses similar to the Carrie Kelley version. During the climax, he briefly dons a Batman armor labeled "Nightwing" when attempting to save Barbara and Alfred.

Batman Ninja
Feudal Japan versions of both Robin and Red Robin appear in the anime film Batman Ninja as well as Red Hood and Nightwing. This was the first time all four mainstream Robin's have appeared together outside of the comics.

Gotham by Gaslight
The 2018 animated film Batman: Gotham by Gaslight, taking place in Gotham City in the 19th century, features three orphan boys, Dickie, Jason and Timmy (voiced by Lincoln Melcher, Grey DeLisle, and Tara Strong, respectively), whose last names are never given. After Batman cripples their gang leader (who refers to them as his "Cock Robins", from the old nursery rhyme), they are recruited by Alfred for odd jobs and eventually adopted by Bruce Wayne and Selina Kyle. This is a departure from the original graphic novel Gotham by Gaslight, in which no version of Robin appears.

Batman vs. Teenage Mutant Ninja Turtles
Robin (Damian Wayne) appears in Batman vs. Teenage Mutant Ninja Turtles.

Teen Titans Go! vs. Teen Titans
The Teen Titans Go! and original Teen Titans animated series versions of Robin appear in Teen Titans Go! vs. Teen Titans, with both voiced by Scott Menville.

Injustice
Both Dick Grayson / Nightwing and Damian Wayne / Robin appears in Injustice with Dick voiced by Derek Phillips and Damian voiced by Zach Callison. As in the video game and its prequel comics, Robin joins Superman's side after accidentally killing Nightwing during the riot in Arkham Asylum. Nightwing's death in Arkham is also slightly different in that the escrima stick that hit him only disoriented him in the comics and he died from falling on a rock, while in the film, he dies from the stick hitting him in the temple and is killed on the spot. Also, Damian later revolts against Superman and the Regime, and reconciles with the deceased Nightwing and rejoins his father at the film's end. Also, as in the Year 3 of the comics, Nightwing becomes Deadman (dubbed Deadwing) after an encounter with Rama Kushna, but he does not replace Boston Brand.

Teen Titans Go! & DC Super Hero Girls: Mayhem in the Multiverse
The Teen Titans Go! and the 1970s Challenge of the Superfriends animated series counterpart versions of Robin appear in the 2022 crossover film Teen Titans Go! & DC Super Hero Girls: Mayhem in the Multiverse with both voiced by Scott Menville from various DC media, In addition, the 1970s counterpart (which is albeit uncredited at the end credits) also appears at the end of the movie.

Video games

Lego Batman

Robin (Tim Drake) is a playable character in Lego Batman: The Videogame,, and Lego Batman 3: Beyond Gotham. Charlie Schlatter voices Robin in the third title. The Robin from the Lego Batman series appears in Lego Dimensions, voiced by Scott Menville. He is kidnapped early in the game's narrative, forcing Batman to find and rescue him. The game also features the Lego Batman Movie version of Robin as a playable character, with bonus story chapters adapting his role in the events of the film; using this Robin in the Teen Titans Go! world transforms him into the version of the character from that series, reprised by Scott Menville.

Robin (Dick Grayson) Is a playable character in Lego Batman 2: DC Super Heroes And is also voiced by Charlie Schlatter.

Robin (Damian Wayne) is a playable character in Lego Batman 2: DC Super Heroes and Lego DC Super-Villains.

Batman: Arkham

In Batman: Arkham City, the Tim Drake Robin, voiced by Troy Baker, appears briefly during the story and is fully playable during the Harley Quinn's Revenge DLC. Both Robin and Dick Grayson as Nightwing are playable in the game's challenge maps. Dick Grayson appears as Robin in Batman: Arkham Origins multiplayer mode, voiced by Josh Keaton, with the ability to unlock Tim Drake's costume from Arkham City. In Batman: Arkham Knight, Tim Drake returns as Robin (voiced by Matthew Mercer) and Dick Grayson returns as Nightwing (voiced by Scott Porter), while Jason Todd (voiced by Troy Baker) makes his debut as a new persona called the Arkham Knight, eventually transitioning into Red Hood.

Injustice
Dick Grayson as Nightwing appears in Injustice: Gods Among Us, voiced by Troy Baker. Damian Wayne, voiced by Neal McDonough, appears as a villainous version of Nightwing in the same game. Damian in his Robin and Nightwing personas later appeared as a playable character in the game's sequel, Injustice 2, voiced by Scott Porter. Jason Todd as the Red Hood, voiced by Cameron Bowen, appears as a playable character in the game via downloadable content.

Other games
The Teen Titans animated series version of Robin is a playable character in both the Game Boy Advance game and the console game adaptations; Scott Menville reprises his role from the TV series. Robin also appears as a playable character in video game adaptations of The Adventures of Batman and Robin and the films Batman Forever and Batman & Robin. The Tim Drake version of Robin, Dick Grayson as Nightwing, and Jason Todd as Red Hood are three of the four main playable characters in the 2022 video game, Gotham Knights.

Toys
Lego produced a Lego Batman line of licensed sets in 2006, and a second Lego Super Heroes line in 2012. The 7783-The Batcave: The Penguin and Mr. Freeze's Invasion set features the Tim Drake version of Robin in his classic costume with a mini speedboat, as well as the 2012 version 6860-The Batcave which features Tim Drake's Robin in his red and black costume. 7785-Arkham Asylum includes Nightwing and his motorcycle as well. Set 6857-The Dynamic Duo Funhouse Escape also features the newer red and black Robin figure. Lego has also released a Robin minifigure (also Tim Drake), based on his appearance from Batman: Arkham City. In 2014, the Damian Wayne incarnation was released in a new set. 

Minifigures of Dick Grayson as both Robin and Nightwing have been released in various Super Heroes sets. His variations as Robin include appearances based on The New 52, Teen Titans, the 1966 Batman TV series and The Lego Batman Movie. His variations as Nightwing include appearances based on The New 52, DC Rebirth and The Lego Batman movie.

Minifigures of Jason Todd, as both Robin and Red Hood, both in their New 52 variations, have also been released.

Radio
During radio broadcasts of The Adventures of Superman'' radio drama Batman and Robin were paired with Superman over the years from September 15, 1945, to 1949. The pairing was pure novelty. The Batman and Robin appearances provided time off for Bud Collyer, the voice of Superman on radio. These episodes called for Superman to be occupied elsewhere and the crime fighting would be handled by Batman and Robin. On that series the voice of Robin was played by Ronald Liss.

Music video

Eminem portrays Robin in his song Without Me (Eminem song); in the video, Robin and Blade (played by Dr. Dre) have to save a teenager from danger. Eminem portrays a number of other characters in this song.

References

External links
 Robin's description on the animated series
 Batman On Film's "Robin" biography

 
Batman lists